Pat or Patrick Curran may refer to:

Pat Curran (American football) (born 1945), tight end
Pat Curran (Australian footballer) (born 1946), Australian rules footballer
Pat Curran (fighter) (born 1987), American MMA fighter
Pat Curran (footballer, born 1917) (1917–2003), English footballer
Patrick Curran (politician), Irish politician
Patrick J. Curran (born 1965), University of North Carolina psychology professor
Pete Curran (1860–1910), British politician, born Patrick Curran
Patrick Curran (priest) (born 1956), Archdeacon of the Eastern Archdeaconry
Patrick Curran (hurler) (born 1996), Irish hurler
Pat Curran (New Zealand politician) (1908–1985), New Zealand politician